Erik Santos Ignasio de Gouveia (born 30 August 1990), known as Erik, is an Aruban footballer who plays as a midfielder for Aruban Division di Honor club RCA and a member of the Aruba national football team. He played at the 2014 FIFA World Cup qualifier.

Honours
RCA
Aruban Division di Honor: 2007–08, 2010–11, 2011–12, 2014–15, 2015–16, 2018–19,
Torneo Copa Betico Croes: 2011-12, 2015-16, 2019-20, 2021-22
Aruba
ABCS Tournament: 2012

International goals

International goals
Scores and results list Aruba's goal tally first.

References 

1990 births
Living people
Association football midfielders
Aruban footballers
Aruba international footballers
SV Racing Club Aruba players
Aruban people of Portuguese descent